Mellish is a surname. Notable people with the surname include:

 Arthur Preston Mellish (1905–1930), Canadian mathematician
 Bob Mellish, Baron Mellish (1913–1998), British Labour politician and Member of Parliament
 Charles Mellish (1737–1797), British Member of Parliament
 David B. Mellish (1831–1874), American politician
 Edith Mellish (1861–1922), New Zealand Anglican deaconess and nun
 Noel Mellish (1880–1962), English Victoria Cross recipient
 George Mellish (1814–1877), British judge
 Henry Mellish (1856–1927), English meteorologist
 John E. Mellish (1886–1970), American amateur astronomer
 Mary Mellish (1849-1901), Canadian educator
 Morgan Mellish (1970–2007), Australian journalist
 Page Mellish, founder of Feminists Fighting Pornography
 Thomas Mellish (1773–1837), English cricketer
 William Mellish (disambiguation)

Fictional characters:
 Fielding Mellish, protagonist of the 1971 film Bananas, played by Woody Allen

See also
 Mellish's comet (actually four such comets)
 1907e, 1907 V, C/1907 T1
 1915a, 1915 II, C/1915 C1
 1915d, 1915 IV, C/1915 R1
 1917a, 1917 I, D/1917 F1, D/Mellish 1
 Melis, a surname and given name
 Mellis (disambiguation)